Austrophthiracarus is a genus of mites in the family Steganacaridae.

Species

 Austrophthiracarus aculeatus Niedbala & Colloff, 1997
 Austrophthiracarus admirabilis (Niedbała, 1982)
 Austrophthiracarus aenus Niedbała, 2000
 Austrophthiracarus amus Niedbala & Stary, 2014
 Austrophthiracarus anceps Niedbała, 2004
 Austrophthiracarus andinus (P. Balogh, 1984)
 Austrophthiracarus anosculpturatus (Mahunka, 1987)
 Austrophthiracarus aokii (Mahunka, 1983)
 Austrophthiracarus aureus Niedbała, 2000
 Austrophthiracarus bah Liu & Zhang, 2015
 Austrophthiracarus baloghi Niedbała, 1987
 Austrophthiracarus bicarinatus Niedbala & Stary, 2014
 Austrophthiracarus cajanumaensis Niedbała & Illig, 2007
 Austrophthiracarus candidulus (Niedbała, 1983)
 Austrophthiracarus caudatus (Balogh & Mahunka, 1977)
 Austrophthiracarus comosus (Aoki, 1980)
 Austrophthiracarus concolor (Sergienko, 2000)
 Austrophthiracarus cordylus Niedbała, 2006
 Austrophthiracarus costai (Macfarlane & Sheals, 1965)
 Austrophthiracarus cronadun Liu & Zhang, 2013
 Austrophthiracarus daimonios Niedbała, 2000
 Austrophthiracarus darwini (Mahunka, 1980)
 Austrophthiracarus dewalteri Liu & Zhang, 2016
 Austrophthiracarus diazae (Ojeda, 1985)
 Austrophthiracarus dilucidus (Niedbała, 1988)
 Austrophthiracarus dissonus Niedbala & Colloff, 1997
 Austrophthiracarus duplex (Mahunka & Mahunka-Papp, 2010)
 Austrophthiracarus egregius Niedbala & Colloff, 1997
 Austrophthiracarus elconsuleoensis Niedbała & Illig, 2007
 Austrophthiracarus elizabethiensis (Niedbała, 1988)
 Austrophthiracarus equisetosus (Mahunka, 1980)
 Austrophthiracarus espeletius (P. Balogh, 1984)
 Austrophthiracarus excellens (Niedbała, 1982)
 Austrophthiracarus facetus Niedbala & Colloff, 1997
 Austrophthiracarus feideri (Balogh & Csiszár, 1963)
 Austrophthiracarus filiformis Liu & Chen, 2014
 Austrophthiracarus flagellatus Liu & OConnor, 2014
 Austrophthiracarus foaensis Niedbała & Penttinen, 2007
 Austrophthiracarus foveoreticulatus (Mahunka, 1980)
 Austrophthiracarus fusticulus Niedbała, 2000
 Austrophthiracarus glennieensis Niedbała, 2006
 Austrophthiracarus globifer (Hammer, 1962)
 Austrophthiracarus golondrinasensis Niedbała & Illig, 2007
 Austrophthiracarus gomerensis Niedbała, 2008
 Austrophthiracarus gongylos Niedbała, 2004
 Austrophthiracarus hallidayi Niedbala & Colloff, 1997
 Austrophthiracarus heteropilosus Niedbała, 2004
 Austrophthiracarus heterotrichus (Mahunka, 1979)
 Austrophthiracarus hiore Liu & Zhang, 2014
 Austrophthiracarus hirtus (P. Balogh, 1984)
 Austrophthiracarus incrassatus (Niedbała, 1984)
 Austrophthiracarus inusitatus (Niedbała, 1983)
 Austrophthiracarus jumbongiensis Niedbała, 2002
 Austrophthiracarus karioi Liu & Zhang, 2014
 Austrophthiracarus kirikiri Liu & Zhang, 2015
 Austrophthiracarus konwerskii Niedbala, 2012
 Austrophthiracarus lacunosus Niedbała, 2008
 Austrophthiracarus lamingtoni Niedbała, 2000
 Austrophthiracarus largus Niedbała, 2000
 Austrophthiracarus latior (Niedbała, 1982)
 Austrophthiracarus longisetosus Liu & Chen, 2014
 Austrophthiracarus longus Niedbała, 2017
 Austrophthiracarus maritimus (Pérez-Íñigo & Pérez-Íñigo, 1996)
 Austrophthiracarus matuku Liu & Zhang, 2014
 Austrophthiracarus michaeli (Niedbała, 1987)
 Austrophthiracarus minisetosus Niedbała, 2004
 Austrophthiracarus mirandus (Niedbała, 1988)
 Austrophthiracarus mitratus (Aoki, 1980)
 Austrophthiracarus multisetosus Balogh & Balogh, 1983
 Austrophthiracarus mutabilis Niedbala & Colloff, 1997
 Austrophthiracarus neonominatus Liu & Wu, 2016 (new name for Austrophthiracarus parapulchellus Niedbała, 2016)
 Austrophthiracarus neotrichus (Wallwork, 1966)
 Austrophthiracarus nexilis Niedbała, 2003
 Austrophthiracarus nimius Niedbała, 2009
 Austrophthiracarus nitidus (Pérez-Iñigo & Baggio, 1988)
 Austrophthiracarus notoporosus Liu & Zhang, 2014
 Austrophthiracarus oenipontanus (Mahunka, 1982)
 Austrophthiracarus olivaceus (Jacot, 1929)
 Austrophthiracarus papillosus (Parry, 1979)
 Austrophthiracarus paraandinus (Subías, 2010)
 Austrophthiracarus paracronadun Liu & Wu, 2016
 Austrophthiracarus parafusticulus Niedbała, 2006
 Austrophthiracarus parainusitatus Niedbała & Stary, 2011
 Austrophthiracarus paralargus Niedbała & Penttinen, 2007
 Austrophthiracarus parapilosus Niedbała, 2006
 Austrophthiracarus parapulchellus Niedbała, 2006
 Austrophthiracarus pavidus (Berlese, 1913)
 Austrophthiracarus perpropinqus Niedbala & Colloff, 1997
 Austrophthiracarus perti (Niedbała, 1987)
 Austrophthiracarus phaleratus (Niedbała, 1982)
 Austrophthiracarus pilosus Niedbala & Colloff, 1997
 Austrophthiracarus portentosus (Niedbała, 1988)
 Austrophthiracarus pseudotuberculatus Mahunka, 2008
 Austrophthiracarus pulchellus Niedbała, 1993
 Austrophthiracarus pullus (Niedbała, 1989)
 Austrophthiracarus rabacalensis Niedbala, 2013
 Austrophthiracarus radiatus Balogh & Mahunka, 1978
 Austrophthiracarus retrorsus Niedbała, 2003
 Austrophthiracarus ridiculus (Mahunka, 1982)
 Austrophthiracarus sarawaki Niedbała, 2000
 Austrophthiracarus scopoli (Niedbała, 1987)
 Austrophthiracarus sellnicki (Niedbała, 1987)
 Austrophthiracarus setiformis Liu, 2017
 Austrophthiracarus strigosus (Niedbała, 1984)
 Austrophthiracarus sudamericanus (Pérez-Iñigo & Baggio, 1993)
 Austrophthiracarus tawhai Liu & Zhang, 2013
 Austrophthiracarus traegardhi (Niedbała, 1987)
 Austrophthiracarus trapezoides Fuangarworn & Lekprayoon, 2011
 Austrophthiracarus tricarinatus (Niedbała, 1988)
 Austrophthiracarus tuberculatus Niedbała & Corpuz-Raros, 1998
 Austrophthiracarus valdiviaensis Niedbała, 2008
 Austrophthiracarus vestigius Liu & Wu, 2016
 Austrophthiracarus vicinus (Niedbała, 1984)
 Austrophthiracarus villosus (Niedbała, 1982)
 Austrophthiracarus waitere Liu & Zhang, 2015
 Austrophthiracarus warburtonensis Niedbała, 2006
 Austrophthiracarus weldboroughensis Niedbała, 2006
 Austrophthiracarus willmanni Niedbała, 1987
 Austrophthiracarus zeuktos Niedbała, 2003

References

Sarcoptiformes